Carl Spitz (August 26, 1894 – September 15, 1976) was a Hollywood dog trainer, most famous for owning and training the female Cairn Terrier Terry, who portrayed Toto in the 1939 MGM fantasy film The Wizard of Oz. Spitz developed the method of using silent hand signals to direct an animal.

Career
Spitz was born in Germany where he trained military and police dogs in WW1. He trained under Konrad Most, a pioneer of dog training. Spitz emigrated to the United States in 1926 and opened the Hollywood Dog Training School. According to screenwriter Jane Hall, Spitz went through the book The Wonderful Wizard of Oz, “picking out whatever tricks or mannerisms Toto was supposed to have” and trained Terry accordingly. Spitz also trained Buck, the St. Bernard from the movie Call of the Wild, starring Clark Gable. Spitz would later go on to become the man responsible for setting up America's WWII War-Dog Program. He appeared on You Bet Your Life on 22nd February 1950, where he states that he was from "near Heidelberg".

He died in 1976, in Los Angeles County, California at the age of 82 and was buried in Glendale's Forest Lawn Memorial Park Cemetery in the Great Mausoleum in the Iris Columbarium section.

References

External links

 
 

Dog trainers
German emigrants to the United States
1894 births
1976 deaths
Burials at Forest Lawn Memorial Park (Glendale)